Sarah Blake may refer to:

 Sarah Blake (novelist), American author of Postmistress 
 Sarah Blake (poet) (born 1984), American poet and author of the novel Naamah
 Sarah Blake (silversmith), 19th-century English silversmith